Al-Ahly Sports Cultural & Social Club known as Al-Ahly SCSC is a Libyan Sports club based in Benghazi, Libya. Al-Ahly SC has its roots in a political party, the Omar al Mukhtar society.

History
Al-Ahly SC Libya was made a professional football club in 1947, although they had existed years before then. Al Ahly is the most supported club in Benghazi and is famous in Libya for its passionate, loyal and sometimes violent crowds, who stood by the club through frustrating times.

In 2000, the club's headquarters and training complex was demolished by the Libyan government, supposedly destroying records, trophies and medals of the club. The demolition was allegedly carried out in response to Al-Ahly fans insulting Saadi Gaddafi by dressing a donkey in a shirt baring his squad number, but other sources pointed to the burning a few days before of the Libyan Football Federation offices in Benghazi by angry Al-Ahly fans as the matter. The club was then given an indefinite ban which lasted until 2005. Saadi Gadafi had denied all the allegations.

The club has been given  of land for a new ground by the Libyan Jamahiriya government, although it cannot afford to develop it. Al Ahly is one of the biggest clubs in Libya, and along with Tripoli's two big clubs.

Crest

Note: Alahly SC (Benghazi) is the only club in Libya which has a star in its logo before reaching 10 league titles.

Squad

Current squad
The 2013–14 season

Staff
  Abdellatif Masoud (Under 19 Team), (Assistant coach)
  Muhammad Al Bousseffi (First Team), (Goalkeepers coach)
  Masoud Abdellatif (Under 19 Team), (Head coach)
  Hashim Alfllah (First Team), (Team doctor)
  Wanis Kheir (First Team), (Assistant coach)
  Tarek Thabet (First Team), (Head coach)

History

Head coaches

Team captains since founding

Former players

Honours

 Libyan Premier League:
Winners (4):1969/70, 1971/72, 1974/75, 1991/92
Runners-up (11): 1963/64, 1968/69, 1970/71, 1972/73, 1975/76, 1984/85, 1987/88, 1998/99, 2008/09, 2009/10
Semi-finals (7): 1963/64, 1975/76, 1982/83, 1984/85, 1985/86, 1990/91, 1995/96,

 Libyan Cup: 3
1987, 1991, 1996

 Libyan Eastern Championship - League of Cyrenaica: 6
1957, 1960, 1963, 1964, 1968, 1970

 Benghazi Championship: 4
1950, 1951, 1954, 1956

Performance in CAF competitions
 African Cup of Champions Clubs / CAF Champions League: 7 appearances

1971 – First Round
1973 – Second Round
1976 – First Round

2010 – Preliminary Round
2014 – Group stage – Quarter-finals
2018–19 – First Round
2020–21 – First Round

 CAF Confederation Cup: 1 appearance
2009 – First Round

 CAF Cup: 1 appearance
1999 – First Round

References

External links
Official website
 Windows App
 Windows Phone App

 
Sport in Benghazi
Association football clubs established in 1947
Football clubs in Libya
1947 establishments in Libya